Kenneth Hsien-yung Pai (born July 11, 1937) is a Chinese writer from Taiwan who has been described as a "melancholy pioneer". He was born in Guilin, Guangxi at the cusp of the Second Sino-Japanese War. Pai's father was the Kuomintang (KMT) general Bai Chongxi (Pai Chung-hsi), whom he later described as a "stern, Confucian father" with "some soft spots in his heart."  Pai was diagnosed with tuberculosis at the age of seven, during which time he would have to live in a separate house from his siblings (of which he would have a total of nine).  He lived with his family in Chongqing, Shanghai, and Nanjing before moving to the British-controlled Hong Kong in 1948 as CPC forces turned the tide of the Chinese Civil War. In 1952, Pai and his family resettled in Taiwan, where the KMT had relocated the Republic of China after defeat by the Communists in 1949.

Chronology
Pai studied in La Salle College, a Hong Kong Catholic boys' high school, until he left for Taiwan with his family.  In 1956, Pai enrolled at National Cheng Kung University as a hydraulic engineering major, because he wanted to participate in the Three Gorges Dam Project. The following year, he passed the entrance examination for the foreign literature department of National Taiwan University and transferred there to study English literature. In September 1958, after completing his first year of study, he published his first short story "Madame Ching" in the magazine Literature.  Two years later, he collaborated with several NTU classmates—e.g., Chen Ruoxi, Wang Wen-hsing, Ouyang Tzu—to launch Modern Literature (Xiandai wenxue), in which many of his early works were published.  He was also known to frequent the Cafe Astoria in Taipei.

Pai went abroad in 1963 to study literary theory and creative writing at the University of Iowa in the Iowa Writers' Workshop. That same year, Pai's mother, the parent with whom Pai had the closest relationship, died, and it was this death to which Pai attributes the melancholy that pervades his work.  After earning his M.A. from Iowa, he became a professor of Chinese literature at the University of California, Santa Barbara, and has resided in Santa Barbara ever since. Pai retired from UCSB in 1994.  Pai's cousin is Hong Kong radio personality Pamela Peck.

Major works
Pai's most famous work of fiction, Taipei People (1971), is a seminal work of Chinese modernism that mixes both literary Chinese and experimental modernist techniques. In terms of his choice of themes, Pai's work is also far ahead of its time. His novel, Crystal Boys (1983), tells the story of a group of homosexual youths living in 1960s Taipei, largely from the viewpoint of a gay youth who is thrown out of his father's home.  The novel's comparison of the dark corners of Taipei's New Park, the characters' main cruising area, with the cloistered society of Taiwan of that period proved quite unacceptable to Taipei's then KMT-dominated establishment, though Pai has generally remained a loyal KMT supporter.

Influence
Among other writers in Taiwan, Pai is appreciated for sophisticated narratives that introduce controversial and groundbreaking perspectives to Chinese literature. His major works, discussed above, have been widely influential.

Further, Pai's writings while in the US in the early 1960s have greatly contributed to an understanding of the Chinese experience in postwar America. "Death in Chicago" (1964) is a semi-autobiographical account of a young Chinese man who, on the eve of his graduation from the English Literature department of the University of Chicago, discovers that his mother has died back home. "Pleasantville" (1964) explores the depressed state of a Chinese mother in the upper-class New York suburbs who feels alienated by the Americanization of her Chinese husband and daughter. Both "Death in Chicago" and "Pleasantville" subtly criticize America as a superficial and materialistic culture that can cause immigrant Chinese to feel lonely and isolated.

In recent years, Pai has gained some acclaim in Mainland Chinese literary circles. He has held various lectures at Beijing Normal University, among others. In the Beijing University Selection of Modern Chinese Literature: 1949–1999 published in 2002, three of Pai's works are included under the time period 1958–1978. These stories reflect the decadence of Shanghai high society in the Republican era. This subject matter constitutes only a small segment of Pai's diverse work, yet it fits particularly well with orthodox renditions of pre-1949 history taught on the Mainland.

In April 2000, a series of five books representing Pai's lifework was published by Huacheng Publishing House in Guangzhou. This series is widely available in Mainland bookstores. It includes short stories, essays, diary entries, and the novel Niezi. A lengthy preface in Volume 1 was penned by Ou Yangzi, a fellow member of the group that founded the journal Xiandai Wenxue in Taiwan in the 1950s.

Pai was born Muslim, attended missionary Catholic schools and embraced Buddhist meditation practices in the United States.

References

Portrait 
  Bai Xianyong. A Portrait by Kong Kai Ming at Hong Kong Baptist University Library

External links

 Brief introduction to Pai Hsien-yung in Xinhuanet

1937 births
American people of Hui descent
American writers of Chinese descent
Chinese emigrants to the United States
American gay writers
Hui people
Chinese former Muslims
Living people
Nanyang Model High School alumni
National Taiwan University alumni
National Cheng Kung University alumni
People from Guilin
Taiwanese Buddhists
Hui Buddhists
Taiwanese former Muslims
Taiwanese male novelists
Taiwanese people of Hui descent
Taiwanese LGBT writers
LGBT Buddhists
Converts to Buddhism from Islam
Recipients of the Order of Brilliant Star
Male novelists
Chinese Civil War refugees
Taiwanese people from Guangxi
Taiwanese male short story writers
20th-century Taiwanese writers
Scholars of Chinese opera